Cotyledon orbiculata, commonly known as pig's ear or round-leafed navel-wort, is a South African succulent plant belonging to the genus Cotyledon.

Description
It has gray-green leaves (up to ), which naturally develop a white, powdery substance (known as farina) on their surfaces; this farina helps reflect sunlight and conserve water. If a specific leaf area is brushed against (or even gently disturbed), the farina will noticeably become smudged. While this powder does not regenerate when disturbed  or wiped off, this is normally not detrimental and very rarely unsightly. The majority of succulent plants will,  ultimately, lose and replace their older leaves with time. Ironically, water (as dew, marine layer/fog, mist, rain, or even garden hose or hand-watering), does not seem to wash the farina off, and it reappears again as the leaves are drying. The shape of the leaves was thought to have a resemblance to a pig's ear, thus the common name.

The bell-shaped flowers, which appear in winter, are usually a blood orange-red or a paler salmon-orange; yellow varieties also exist. To the untrained eye, the blossoms may resemble the blooms of the distantly-related Kalanchoe, which is also native to Africa. They also hang and droop from the top of a -tall stalk. The tubular flower crown has no bulges, is approximately 20 millimeters long, and up to 9 millimeters in diameter. The bent, back crown-tips are orange, red or yellow, and are 12 millimeters long. The stamens protrude 2 to 3 millimeters. The yellow anthers are elongated and approx. 1.75 millimeters in diameter. The semi-transversely elongated nectar scales are dull and yellowish-green, and are 1.5 × 2 millimeters in size. The 10 stamens are attached to the base of the corolla (2 per petal), and the 5 carpels each have a style longer than the ovary.

Varieties and cultivars
This diverse species includes a large number of hybrids and cultivated forms, some of which may show a distinct resemblance to Kalanchoe thyrsiflora or K. luciae.

Recognised varieties include:

Cotyledon orbiculata var. flanaganii (Schönl. & Baker f.) Toelken ― with elongated leaves in whorls 
Cotyledon orbiculata var. oblonga (Haw.) DC. ― defined by its red leaf-margins and 20–50 cm inflorescence 
Cotyledon orbiculata var. spuria (L.) Toelken ― defined by having (2–)3–5 bract pairs on the stem of its inflorescence

Other forms include: 
Cotyledon orbiculata var. dactylopsis ― small and proliferous plant with elongated, terete leaves
Cotyledon orbiculata var. engleri (= cultivar: "Viridis") ― leaves a deep and slightly glaucous green
Cotyledon orbiculata var. mucronata ― defined by its mucronate leaves
Cotyledon orbiculata var. oophylla Dinter (= cultivars: "Boegoeberg" and "Lizard Eggs") ― defined by its round, white, pruinose leaves
Cotyledon orbiculata var. undulata Haw. (= cultivar: "Silver Crown") ― defined by its wide, flat, round leaves with bent margin
Cotyledon orbiculata f. takbok ― leaves often with multiple lobes, becoming antler-like

Distribution
Native to South Africa, it is popular in gardens in many countries. In the wild, it grows naturally in rocky outcrops in grassy shrubland and the Karoo region. In New Zealand, it is considered an invasive plant and is listed on the National Pest Plant Accord.

Uses
Cotyledon orbiculata has a number of medicinal uses. In South Africa, the fleshy part of the leaf is applied to warts and corns. Heated leaves are used as poultices for boils and other inflammations. Single leaves may be eaten as a vermifuge and the juice has been used to treat epilepsy.

However, the leaves contain a bufanolide called cotyledontoxin, which is toxic to sheep, goats, horses, cattle, poultry, and dogs, causing a condition known as cotyledonosis.

References

External links

 Cotyledon orbiculata at Weedbusters (New Zealand)

Crassulaceae
Plants described in 1753
Taxa named by Carl Linnaeus